The following lists events that happened in 1967 in Iceland.

Incumbents
President – Ásgeir Ásgeirsson
Prime Minister – Bjarni Benediktsson

Events

Births

2 January – Jón Gnarr, actor, comedian and politician
19 March – Björgólfur Thor Björgólfsson, businessman
17 April – Birgitta Jónsdóttir, politician
9 June – Helgi Hjörvar, politician.
29 August – Jon Stephenson von Tetzchner, programmer and businessman

Deaths

References

 
1960s in Iceland
Iceland
Iceland
Years of the 20th century in Iceland